The Petit Grépillon is a mountain of the Mont Blanc Massif, located on the border between Italy and Switzerland. It lies on the range south-east of Mont Dolent, between the glaciers of Pré de Bard (Aosta Valley) and Dolent (Valais).

References

External links
 Petit Grépillon on Hikr

Mountains of the Alps
Alpine three-thousanders
Mountains of Valais
Mountains of Italy
Italy–Switzerland border
International mountains of Europe
Mountains of Switzerland